Asia Pacific Deaf Games is a deaf multi-sport event established in 1984 which is held every 4 years in the Asia Pacific region. It is the successor to the "Far Eastern Deaf Football Championship" which was held in Taipei in 1983. The inaugural games was held in 1984 in Hong Kong. At that time, the games was known as the Asia Pacific Deaf Football Championship which was held biennially until 1988. In 1988, the games' governing body Asia Pacific Deaf Sports Confederation was formed during the 3rd Championship in Melbourne, Australia with Ms. Wendy Home as its first administrator. The games changed its name to its present name, the Asia Pacific Deaf Games when the games was held in Seoul, South Korea in 1992 after Asia Pacific Deaf Sports Confederation passed a resolution to change the name of the games, which has since been held once every four years.

List of Asia Pacific Deaf Games 

Source:

List of participating nations 

 
 
 
 
  Chinese Taipei

List of Asia Pacific Deaf Games sports

  1996 -
  1996 -
  (2012 Demonstration sport)
  2000 -
  2000 -
  2012 -  
  All
  2012 -
  2012 - 
  2000 -
  1992 -
  2012 -
  2012 - 
  2000 - 2012

All-time medal table

1984 Asia Pacific Deaf Football Championship

Sports

 

Medal table

1986 Asia Pacific Deaf Football Championship

Sports

 

Medal table

1988 Asia Pacific Deaf Football Championship

Sports

 

Medal table

1992 Asia Pacific Deaf Games

Sports

 
 

Medal table

1996 Asia Pacific Deaf Games

Sports

 
 
 
 

Medal table

2000 Asia Pacific Deaf Games

Sports

 
 
  
 
 
    
    
   

Medal table

2012 Asia Pacific Deaf Games

Venues

Seoul
Seoul Sports Complex
Seoul Olympic Stadium - Athletics
Secondary/Auxiliary Stadium - Athletics, Football, Closing ceremony
Jamsil Students' Gymnasium - Table tennis
Jamsil Arena - Opening ceremony
Olympic Park
Olympic Park - Cycling
Seoul Olympic Park Tennis Center - Tennis
SK Olympic Handball Gymnasium - Futsal
Others
Jamsil High school - Judo
Seoul Physical Education High school - Swimming

Gyeonggi Province
Namyangju Sports Complex
Stadium - Football
Gymnasium - Badminton
Tancheon Sports Complex
Tancheon Bowling Alley - Bowling
Tancheon Secondary Stadium - Baseball (Demonstration)
Others
Korea Armed Forces Athletic Corps Gymnasium - Basketball, Taekwondo
Samsung Training Center - Volleyball

Sports

 
 
  (Demonstration sport)
  
    
    
 
    
   
    
    
  
   
   

Medal table

2015 Asia Pacific Deaf Games

Officially known as: 8th Asia Pacific Deaf GamesMotto: The Power of SilenceOfficially opened by: Cheng Wen-tsan (Mayor of Taoyuan)Athlete's oath: Huang Shu Min (Bowling)Torch lighter: Wang Shih Wei (Athletics), Peng Si Ting (Taekwondo)

Venues

 Taoyuan Arena: Opening and closing ceremony, Table tennis
 Taoyuan City Track Field: Athletics, Football
 Luzhu District Badminton Hall: Badminton
 Da Taoyuan Bowling Center: Bowling
 Blue Pond Park: Cycling
 No. 61 Provincial Highway northbound 30-48 km: Cycling (road race)
 National Taoyuan Agricultural & Industrial Vocational High School: Judo, Taekwondo
 National Taiwan Sport University
Outdoor tennis court: Tennis
Gymnasium: Futsal
 Taoyuan City Swimming Pool: Swimming
 Ming Chuan University (Taoyuan Campus)
Gymnasium: Basketball
Athletic field: Football
 Central Police University: Football

Participating nations

 
 
  Chinese Taipei

Sports

 
 
  
 
    
 
 *
 
 
 
 
   

Non-Deaflympics sport is denoted with asterisk (*)

Calendar

Medal table

Key

5 Games records were broken, all were from athletics.

Athletics

Badminton

Basketball

Bowling

Cycling

Football

Futsal

Judo

Swimming

Table tennis

Taekwondo

Tennis

Logos and mascots of the Asia Pacific Deaf Games

See also
 Deaflympics
 ASEAN Deaf Games

References

External links 
 
 Asia Pacific Games For The Deaf (APGD)
 Games History
 Asia Pacific Deaf Sports Confederation website
 2012 Asia Pacific Deaf Games website
 2015 Asia Pacific Deaf Games website
 2019 Asia Pacific Deaf Games website
 International Games

Deaflympics
Deaf sports competitions
Multi-sport events in Asia
Disabled multi-sport events